Acrossocheilus jishouensis is a species of cyprinid fish in the genus Acrossocheilus.

References

Jishouensis
Fish described in 1997